Girish Pandit Baccharaj Vyas (born 27 March 1958) elected as member of the Maharashtra Legislative Council from Nagpur Local Authorities’ Constituency.

Positions held

Within BJP

State Spokesman, MaharashtraBJP

Legislative

Member of Legislative Council, start 4th Jan 2016

References

Maharashtra politicians
Bharatiya Janata Party politicians from Maharashtra
Members of the Maharashtra Legislative Council
Politicians from Nagpur
1958 births
Living people